Travis Lamont Hawkins (born February 18, 1991) is a retired gridiron football defensive back and current youth football coach. He played college football for Delaware after transferring from Maryland. Hawkins was originally signed by the New England Patriots of the National Football League (NFL) as an undrafted free agent in 2014, before being released in the preseason. He then played in 14 games for the Toronto Argonauts of the Canadian Football League (CFL) in 2015, making 38 tackles and two interceptions.

In 2017, Hawkins was among the first five players signed to the Baltimore Brigade of the Arena Football League.  He was placed on the league suspension list on March 17, before being signed by the Montreal Alouettes of the CFL on May 24. He was placed on the other league exempt list for the Brigade on June 8. He was released by the Alouettes on November 30, 2017.

After retiring from playing, Hawkins began working as a football coach at Northwest High School in Germantown, Maryland, being named the head varsity coach in 2021.

References

External links

CFL statistics
Montreal Alouettes bio
Delaware Fightin' Blue Hens football bio
 https://casesearch.courts.state.md.us/casesearch/inquiryDetail.jis?caseId=D06CR22006096&loc=23&detailLoc=ODYCRIM

1991 births
Living people
African-American players of American football
African-American players of Canadian football
American football defensive backs
Baltimore Brigade players
Canadian football defensive backs
Delaware Fightin' Blue Hens football players
Maryland Terrapins football players
Montreal Alouettes players
New England Patriots players
Toronto Argonauts players
Sportspeople from Rockville, Maryland
21st-century African-American sportspeople